Each "article" in this category is a collection of entries about several stamp issuers, presented in alphabetical order. The entries are formulated on the micro model and so provide summary information about all known issuers.  

See the :Category:Compendium of postage stamp issuers page for details of the project.

Obock 

Dates 	1892 – 1894
Capital 	Obock
Currency  	100 centimes = 1 franc

Refer 	Djibouti

Occupation Francaise 

Refer 	Arad (French Occupation)

Occupied Enemy Territories (TEO) 

Refer 	Syria (French Occupation)

Oceanic Settlements 

Refer 	French Oceanic Settlements

Oil Rivers Protectorate 

Dates 	1892 – 1893
Capital 	Enugu
Currency 	12 pence = 1 shilling; 20 shillings = 1 pound

Refer 	Nigerian Territories

Oldenburg 

Dates 	1852 – 1867
Currency 	72 groat = 1 thaler

Refer 	German States

Olonetz 

Refer 	Aunus (Finnish Occupation)

Olsztyn 

Refer 	Allenstein

Oltre Giuba 

Refer 	Jubaland

Oman 

Dates 	1971 –
Capital 	Muscat
Currency  	1000 baizas = 1 rial saidi

Main Article Needed 

See also 	Muscat;
		Muscat & Oman

OMF 

Refer 	Syria (French Occupation)

ONF Castellorizo 

Refer 	Castelrosso (French Occupation)

Orange Free State 

Dates 	1868 – 1900
Capital 	Bloemfontein
Currency 	12 pence = 1 shilling; 20 shillings = 1 pound

Refer 	Orange River Colony

Orange River Colony 

Dates 	1900 – 1907
Capital 	Bloemfontein
Currency 	12 pence = 1 shilling; 20 shillings = 1 pound

Main Article Needed 

Includes 	Orange Free State

Orchha 

Dates 	1913 – 1939
Currency 	12 pies = 1 anna; 16 annas = 1 rupee

Refer 	Indian Native States

Osterreich 

Refer 	Austria

Ostland 

Dates 	1941 – 1945
Currency 	100 pfennige = 1 mark

Refer 	German Occupation Issues (WW2)

Ottoman Empire 

Refer 	Turkey

Oubangui-Chari 

Dates 	1922 – 1937
Capital 	Bangui
Currency 	100 centimes = 1 franc

Main Article Postage stamps and postal history of Ubangi-Shari

Includes 	Oubangui-Chari-Tchad

See also 	Central African Republic;
		French Equatorial Africa

Oubangui-Chari-Tchad 

Dates 	1915 – 1922
Capital 	Bangui
Currency 	100 centimes = 1 franc

Refer 	Oubangui-Chari

References

Bibliography
 Stanley Gibbons Ltd, Europe and Colonies 1970, Stanley Gibbons Ltd, 1969
 Stanley Gibbons Ltd, various catalogues
 Stuart Rossiter & John Flower, The Stamp Atlas, W H Smith, 1989
 XLCR Stamp Finder and Collector's Dictionary, Thomas Cliffe Ltd, c.1960

External links
 AskPhil – Glossary of Stamp Collecting Terms
 Encyclopaedia of Postal History

Oa